Ubaporanga is a municipality in the state of Minas Gerais in the Southeast region of Brazil.

Transportation
The city is served by Ubaporanga Airport.

See also
List of municipalities in Minas Gerais

References

Municipalities in Minas Gerais